Isus Angelov (born 30 March 1994) is a Bulgarian footballer, currently playing for Botev Galabovo as a midfielder.

References

External links 

Profile at Beroe.bg

Living people
1994 births
Bulgarian footballers
Association football midfielders
PFC Beroe Stara Zagora players
FC Vereya players
FC Botev Galabovo players
First Professional Football League (Bulgaria) players
Sportspeople from Stara Zagora